Labuerda (in Aragonese: A Buerda; and officially "Labuerda-A Buerda") is a municipality located in the province of Huesca, Aragon, Spain. According to the 2009 data from INE, the municipality has a population of 172 inhabitants.

Villages
Labuerda, the main town
San Vicente de Labuerda, which includes the municipality's main attraction, the church of San Vicente. The building has a 12th-century Romanesque nucleus, including the nave, presbytery and the semicircular apse. In the 16th century the side chapels, the sacristy and the bell tower were added, and in the 18th century another chapel and a portico.

Twin towns
 Cadeilhan-Trachère, France

References

External links

Municipalities in the Province of Huesca